The All England Plate, also referred to as the Wimbledon Plate, was a tennis competition held at the Wimbledon Championships which consisted of players who were defeated in the first or second rounds of the singles competition. The first edition, for male players only, was held in 1896 and the winner was awarded £5 prize money and the runner-up £3. In 1933 the first women's edition was held. In 1975 the competition also became open to players who had lost in the third round of the singles competition as well as players who only participated in the doubles competition. The last edition of the men's tournament was held in 1981 and for the women in 1989.

Finals

Men

Women

References

External links
 Official Wimbledon Championships website

All England Plate
Recurring sporting events established in 1896